Felix Oschmautz (born 18 July 1999) is an Austrian slalom canoeist who has competed at the international level since 2014. 

Oschmautz won two bronze medals at the 2022 European Championships in Liptovský Mikuláš. He represented Austria at the delayed 2020 Summer Olympics in Tokyo, finishing fourth in the K1 event.

He has won four medals at the ICF World Junior and U23 Canoe Slalom Championships with a gold (2017) and a silver (2016) in the Junior K1 event, a silver in the U23 K1 event (2022) and a bronze (2018) in the U23 K1 team event.

Results

World Cup individual podiums

Complete World Cup results

Complete Championship Results

References

External links

 

1999 births
Living people
Austrian male canoeists
Canoeists at the 2020 Summer Olympics
Olympic canoeists of Austria